Sektou is a 2008 Algerian film.

Synopsis 
Smain works on nighttime radio show. He goes home at dawn hoping to go to bed. But that bed is on the third floor of a busy street in downtown Alger. The city starts to awaken. For Smain to sleep is a dream, to awaken a nightmare.

Awards 
 Poulain d’Or FESPACO 2009
 Taghit d’Or 2008

External links 

2008 films
Algerian short films